is a town located in Shiki District, Nara Prefecture, Japan.

As of April 1, 2017, the town has an estimated population of 7,013. The total area is 4.07 km². It is known to be smallest municipality in area in Nara Prefecture.

Education
 Primary Schools
 Miyake Elementary School
 Junior High Schools
 Shikige Junior High School

Transportation

Rail 
 Kintetsu Railway
 Kashihara Line Iwami Station
 Tawaramoto Line Tajima Station

References

External links

  

Towns in Nara Prefecture